Carmen Thomas and Camille Thomas  are Canadian musicians and twin sisters who perform as Carmen & Camille. Their hit single, "Shine 4U," received a nomination for the 2010 Juno Award for Dance Recording of the Year. Their début studio album, Two, was released in 2006 followed by 2 EPs.

History
The sisters were raised in White Rock, British Columbia and graduated from Semiahmoo Secondary School in nearby Surrey.  Their father, John Thomas, currently serves as their professional manager. Their parents are also musical and part of the reason why the twin sisters went into business. Carmen holds an Associate of Arts degree in broadcast journalism from the British Columbia Institute of Technology.  She appeared as a host on Tommy Wolski's Sport of Kings, a weekly Citytv sports news show on horse racing.  Camille, who began her studies in fashion design, later transferred to Vancouver Community College, where she completed the jazz vocal program.

Carmen & Camille displayed a love of performing music from early childhood.  They have cited Sheryl Crow, Depeche Mode, Fleetwood Mac, Heart, Jimi Hendrix, Janis Joplin, Led Zeppelin, No Doubt, and Pink Floyd as among their musical influences.  As students in elementary school, Carmen played the flute, while Camille joined a jazz choir.  Shortly after graduation from high school, they decided to perform and record music professionally.  The sisters, who write their own songs as well as play guitars and flute, began singing at clubs and other venues in major cities throughout North America, Europe, and the Middle East.

The twins are currently active on their youtube channel titled (Carmen & Camille).

Career
In March 2006, Carmen & Camille released their début album, Two, on their own label, TwinSpin Music.  Several songs from this record were featured on the MTV reality show series The Hills, giving the sisters' music widespread exposure for the first time.  Their 2009 single "Shine 4U," co-written with producer Ryan Stewart, won the CHUM Emerging Artist Initiative.  Consequently, the song enjoyed national airplay across Canada, and the music video was televised on MuchMusic.  In March 2010, "Shine 4U" received additional recognition as a nominee for the 2010 Juno Award for Dance Recording of the Year. Carmen and Camille have sung the Canadian National Anthem at several games for the Canucks hockey team.

Carmen & Camille divide their time between Vancouver and Los Angeles, where they set up residence in December 2009.

Discography

Studio albums

Singles

Awards and nominations

References

External links
 

Musical groups established in 2006
Canadian expatriate musicians in the United States
Canadian pop music groups
Musical groups from Vancouver
Canadian twins
British Columbia Institute of Technology alumni
2006 establishments in British Columbia
Twin musical duos